An attack occurred on 21 January 2016 in Mogadishu, Somalia. Al-Shabaab drove a suicide car bomb at the gate of the Beach View Café, a seafood restaurant overlooking the city's Lido Beach. Another blast struck about an hour later as government soldiers laid siege to the restaurant. After the blasts, militants entered the building, some of them by boat, and attacked civilians within. About 20 people were killed and 17 others wounded. Several perpetrators were also killed and one was arrested.

Al-Qaeda linked group Al-Shabaab claimed responsibility, saying the attackers used AK-47s and suicide vests. The attack occurred six days after al-Shabaab attacked a Kenyan-run AMISOM base in El Adde, Gedo.

See also 

 2016 timeline of the Somali Civil War
 Pescatore Seafood Restaurant bombing, another attack in Lido Beach

References

2010s in Mogadishu
2016 in Somalia
2016 murders in Somalia
January 2016 attack
2016 mass shootings in Africa
21st-century mass murder in Somalia
January 2016
Attacks on buildings and structures in 2016
January 2016
Attacks on restaurants in Africa
Islamic terrorist incidents in 2016
January 2016 crimes in Africa
Mass murder in 2016
January 2016 attack
Mass shootings in Somalia
Suicide bombings in 2016
January 2016 attack
Suicide car and truck bombings in Somalia
Terrorist incidents in Somalia in 2016
Somali Civil War (2009–present)
Building bombings in Somalia